Poplar Island may refer to:

Canada
Poplar Island (British Columbia)
Poplar Island (Prince Edward Island)

United Kingdom
Poplar Island, River Thames
Poplar Eyot

United States
Poplar Island (Chesapeake Bay)
Poplar Island (West Virginia)